Hesamabad (also Romanized as Ḩesāmābād; also known as Hīsāmābād and Kolūn Tappeh) is a village in Darbandrud Rural District, in the Central District of Asadabad County, Hamadan Province, Iran. At the 2006 census, its population was 2,045, in 434 families.

References 

Populated places in Asadabad County